Maria Palaiologina was the daughter of the Byzantine Emperor Michael VIII Palaiologos who became the wife of the Mongol ruler Abaqa Khan, and an influential Christian leader among the Mongols. After Abaqa's death she became the leader of a Monastery in Constantinople which was popularly named after her as Saint Mary of the Mongols. Her monastic name was Melanie.

Historical context
In the 13th century, the Mongol Empire founded by Genghis Khan had expanded to its greatest extent. Hulagu Khan, grandson of Genghis, had swept with his army through Persia and Syria, destroying centuries-old Islamic caliphates, those of the Abbasids and Ayyubids, and led the 1258 Sack of Baghdad, considered to be the single most disastrous event in the history of Islam.

However, the Mongol Empire was experiencing internal dissension, and though the center of power was the Great Khan in Karakorum, the Empire had split into four "khanates", one for each of four of Genghis's grandsons. Hulagu's portion was known as the Ilkhanate and stretched through the area today that covers parts of Turkey and Iran on the west, and Pakistan on the east. The section to the north, covering parts of Russian and Eastern Europe, was known as the Golden Horde. Relations between the khanates were not friendly, and battles erupted between them, even as they both were attempting to further extend the Empire westwards towards Europe, Greece, and the Middle East.

Arranged marriage
Michael VIII, the Byzantine Emperor based in Constantinople, attempted to stay on friendly relations with both khanates. Hulagu had been negotiating for a lady of the imperial family of Constantinople to be added to his number of wives, and Michael selected his illegitimate daughter Maria. He also betrothed another of his daughters, Maria's sister Euphrosyne Palaiologina, to Nogai Khan, head of the Golden Horde. Both khanates maintained an attitude of tolerance towards the Christians.

On her journey to marry Hulagu, Maria left Constantinople in 1265, escorted by the abbot of Pantokrator monastery, Theodosius de Villehardouin. Historian Steven Runciman relates how she was accompanied by the Patriarch Euthymius of Antioch. However, in Caesarea they learned that Hulagu had died, so Maria was instead married to his son, Abaqa Khan. She led a pious life and was quite influential on the politics and the religious outlooks of the Mongols, many of whom were already Nestorian Christians. They had previously looked to Doquz Khatun, Hulagu's wife, as a religious leader. When Doquz also died in 1265, this sentiment turned to Maria, who was called "Despina Khatun" by the Mongols (Δέσποινα being Greek for "Lady").

Widowhood
Maria resided in Persia at court of Abaqa for a period of 15 years, until her husband - follower of Tengri - died and was succeeded by his Muslim brother Ahmad. According to Orlean's manuscript, Baidu Khan was close to Maria during her time in Persia and frequently visited her ordo (nomadic palace) to hear interesting stories about Christianity.

She eventually returned to Constantinople, but in 1307, during the reign of Andronicus II, she was offered again as bride to a Mongolian prince, Charbanda, the Mongol ruler of the Middle East in order to obtain an alliance against the rising power of the Ottomans, who at that time were threatening the Byzantine city of Nicaea. Maria went there, both to encourage its defense and to hasten the negotiations with the Mongols about her wedding. She met with the Ottoman Sultan, Othman, but her menacing behaviour aroused the spirit of the Ottomans. Before the 30,000 troops sent to her aid by the Mongols could reach the city, the Ottomans stormed the fortress of Tricocca, which was the key to Nicaea, and conquered it.

Maria was then forced to go back to Constantinople once again, where she became the Ktetorissa of the Panagiotissa Monastery, and remained there for the rest of her life. According to some sources, she brought back a daughter of her from Abaqa - Theodora Ara Qutlugh.

Legacy

The church of the monastery was officially dedicated to the Virgin Mary, but due to Maria's association with it, it became popularly known as the "Church of Saint Mary of the Mongols". Maria herself was never canonized.

The Church is called by the Turks "the Church of Blood" (Kanli Kilise), as the building saw violent combat during the capture of Constantinople by the Turks. The Church is the only one in Constantinople to have never been converted to a mosque, following an order by Mehmet the Conqueror. It is located in Tevkii Cafer Mektebi Sok, in the quarter of Fener.

There is a surviving mosaic portrait of Maria, from the narthex at the Chora Monastery (she appears as a nun, with an inscription with her monastic name of Melania), in the lower right hand corner of the Deesis scene.

Notes

References

External links

Maria Palaiologina

Maria
Daughters of Byzantine emperors
13th-century births
Year of birth unknown
Byzantine people of the Crusades
Illegitimate children of Byzantine emperors
Year of death unknown
13th-century deaths
Children of Michael VIII Palaiologos
Mongol Empire Christians
13th-century Byzantine nuns